Sistem is the first and only album by Opstrukcija. It was released in 1999. The only known reference to it is an official Badmingtons biography which mentions the album. The track "Let vo prazno" appeared on the compilation CD Preku takvoto in 2001. The track "Odam" appeared on an old version of the Karter Film website, which has since been removed. In late 2012, a Vladimir Petrovski - Karter collection of 20 tracks was found, which included 10 possible Opstrukcija tracks, including Odam.

Known tracks 
Please note that the actual number of tracks and the correct track order is unknown. Some of these tracks may actually be Aleksandar Makedonski tracks. The only confirmed Opstrukcija tracks in this list are "Odam" and "Let vo prazno".

1999 albums